Wildlands Restoration Volunteers (WRV) is a non-profit volunteer-centered organization, established in 1999, that organizes high-quality ecological restoration projects on public lands in the United States.   The WRV mission is to foster a community spirit of shared responsibility for the stewardship and restoration of public and protected lands.  WRV organizes more than 100 volunteer projects per year, completing a wide variety of important habitat restoration and conservation work.  Some projects are completed in a single day, while others may last a weekend or longer.  Projects lasting more than one day allow for camping opportunities in mountain settings.  Attendance averages 60 volunteers, but ranges from 10 to over 100. During most projects, the group provides meals to its volunteers.

WRV has offices in Boulder and Fort Collins and works primarily across Colorado and southern Wyoming.

References

External links
Wildlands Restoration Volunteers

Environmental organizations based in Colorado
Boulder, Colorado
Organizations based in Fort Collins, Colorado
Environmental organizations established in 1999
1999 establishments in the United States
Ecology of the Rocky Mountains